Jean-Michel Lavallière (born December 10, 1990) is a Canadian retired Paralympic swimmer who competed at international swimming competitions. He is a six-time Parapan American Games silver medalist and has competed at the 2016 Summer Paralympics and 2018 Commonwealth Games.

Lavallière announced his retirement shortly after the 2018 Commonwealth Games due to planning to complete his university studies at Laval University.

References

1990 births
Living people
Paralympic swimmers of Canada
Swimmers at the 2016 Summer Paralympics
Swimmers at the 2018 Commonwealth Games
Swimmers from Quebec City
Medalists at the 2015 Parapan American Games
S7-classified Paralympic swimmers